DeHart is a surname and occasionally used as a given name. Notable people with the name include:

Given name
 DeHart Hubbard (1903–1976), American track-and-field athlete
 DeHart H. Ames (1872–1955), American businessman and politician from New York

Surname
 James DeHart (1893–1935), American football player and coach
 Jarret DeHart (born 1994), American baseball coach
 Matt DeHart (born 1984), American intelligence analyst
 Rick DeHart (born 1970), American baseball player
 Tony DeHart (born 1990), American ice hockey player
 Wayne Dehart, American actor
 Evelyn Hu-DeHart (born 1947), Chinese-American academic historian